Jappy is a German social networking service. With over 1.5 million active users it ranked 16th of all German social networks in March 2013.

References

External links
 
 Homepage 
 Jappy wiki 

German social networking websites
Internet properties established in 2001